The Guru language, or Boguru, is a poorly documented South Sudanese Bantu language of uncertain affiliation (though listed as unclassified Zone D.30 by Guthrie). For a while, a number of speakers were refugees in DR Congo, but the language is nearly extinct there as well.

References

Bantu languages
Languages of the Democratic Republic of the Congo